Anzoátegui is one of the 23 component states of Venezuela,

Anzoátegui may also refer to:
 Anzoategui, La Pampa, Argentina
 Anzoátegui, Tolima, Colombia
 Anzoátegui Parish, Morán Municipality, Lara State, Venezuela
 Anzoátegui Municipality, Cojedes State, Venezuela
 Anzoátegui, José Antonio Venezuelan Brigadier General, Independence hero

People with the surname
José Antonio Anzoátegui